Lloyd Anthony Butler (born 13 February 1989) is an English former professional footballer who plays as a centre forward.

Career
Born in Grays, Butler spent his early career in non-league football with Billericay Town and Maldon Town.

He spent the 2009 season with S.League club Geylang United, scoring three goals.

References

1989 births
Living people
People from Grays, Essex
English footballers
Association football forwards
Billericay Town F.C. players
Maldon & Tiptree F.C. players
Geylang International FC players
Singapore Premier League players
English expatriate sportspeople in Singapore
English expatriate footballers
Expatriate footballers in Singapore